Some people named Joseph Morelle:

 Joseph Morelle, U.S. Representative for New York's 25th congressional district since 2018.
 Joe Morelle, chef notable for creating Utica greens.